Rigmor Kofoed-Larsen (born 22 March 1944 in Halden) is a Norwegian politician for the Christian Democratic Party.

She was elected to the Norwegian Parliament from Oppland in 1997, but was not re-elected in 2001.

Kofoed-Larsen was involved in local politics in Lillehammer municipality council from 1975 to 1995, except the term 1983–1987.

References

1944 births
Living people
Christian Democratic Party (Norway) politicians
Members of the Storting
21st-century Norwegian politicians
20th-century Norwegian politicians
People from Halden